Ring is an album by the Gary Burton Quintet with acoustic bassist Eberhard Weber. Burton’s quintet consists of guitarists Mick Goodrick and Pat Metheny, bass guitarist Steve Swallow and drummer Bob Moses.

Track listing

Personnel 
 Gary Burton – vibraharp
 Eberhard Weber – double bass
 Mick Goodrick – guitar
 Pat Metheny – guitar, electric 12-string guitar
 Steve Swallow – bass guitar
 Bob Moses – percussion

References 

1974 albums
Gary Burton albums
Eberhard Weber albums
ECM Records albums
Albums produced by Manfred Eicher